Melissa Smook (born 22 June 1989) is a South African former cricketer who played as a right-arm medium bowler. She appeared in three Twenty20 Internationals for South Africa, all in 2011 against England. She played domestic cricket for Gauteng and Northerns.

References

External links
 
 

1989 births
Living people
South African women cricketers
South Africa women Twenty20 International cricketers
Central Gauteng women cricketers
Northerns women cricketers